Marcel Wuilleumier (born 22 June 1909, date of death unknown) was a Swiss basketball player. He competed in the men's tournament at the 1936 Summer Olympics, with the Swiss team finishing in ninth place.

References

External links
 

1909 births
Year of death missing
Swiss men's basketball players
Olympic basketball players of Switzerland
Basketball players at the 1936 Summer Olympics
Place of birth missing